Including players from the Melbourne Storm that have represented while contracted at the club and the years they  achieved their honours, if known.

International

Australia
603    Glenn Lazarus (1998–99)
660    Rodney Howe (1998-00)
666    Robbie Kearns (1998-01, 2003)
675    Brett Kimmorley (1999-00)
677    Robbie Ross (1999)
682    Scott Hill (2000, 2002, 2004)
727    Matt King (2005–07)
737    Greg Inglis (2006–10)
738    Cameron Smith (2006–17)
742    Antonio Kaufusi (2006)
714    Michael Crocker (2007–08)
744    Cooper Cronk (2007, 2009–17)
745    Israel Folau (2007–08)
746    Dallas Johnson (2007)
748    Ryan Hoffman (2007–12)
751    Billy Slater (2008–17)
767    Brett White (2009)
800    Will Chambers (2015–17)
818    Jordan McLean (2017)
821    Felise Kaufusi (2017–18)
822    Cameron Munster (2017-22)
827    Josh Addo-Carr (2019)
    Harry Grant (2022)

Cook Islands
    Fred Makimare (2009)
    Aaron Teroi (2015)
    Josh Minhinnick (2015)
    Charnze Nicoll-Klokstad (2015)
    Tepai Moeroa (2022)

England
701    Gareth Widdop (2010–13)

Fiji
  Sisa Waqa (2011–13)
  Marika Koroibete (2015)
    Ben Nakubuwai (2016)
    Tui Kamikamica (2016–22)
    Suliasi Vunivalu (2017–19)
    Isaac Lumelume (2019)

France
    Dane Chisholm (2011)

Ireland
    Danny Williams (2000)

Italy
     Daniel Atkinson (2022)
    Cooper Johns (2022)

Lebanon
    Travis Robinson (2015)

New Zealand
640    Stephen Kearney (1999-04)
680    Richard Swain (1999-02)
681    Matt Rua (1999-01)
683    Tasesa Lavea (2000–01)
690    Henry Perenara (2001)
679    David Kidwell (2004–06)
714    Alex Chan (2004)
719    Jake Webster (2005–06)
732    Adam Blair (2006, 2008–10)
742    Jeremy Smith (2007–08)
743    Jeff Lima (2007, 2009)
750    Sika Manu (2008–11)
765    Matt Duffie (2011)
771    Kevin Proctor (2012–16)
775    Jesse Bromwich (2012–22)
778    Tohu Harris (2013–16)
796    Kenny Bromwich (2016–22)
804    Nelson Asofa-Solomona (2017–22)
816    Brandon Smith (2018-22)
819    Jahrome Hughes (2019-22)

Niue
    Kurt Bernard (2014)

Papua New Guinea
167    Marcus Bai (2000–01)
176    John Wilshere (2000–03)
230    Jay Aston (2008)
    Joe Bond (2009)
273    Justin Olam (2017-22)
293    Zev John (2019)
289    Xavier Coates (2022)

Samoa
    Smith Samau (2006)
    Jeff Lima (2006)
    Willie Isa (2010)
    Junior Sa'u (2013)
    Junior Moors (2013)
    Young Tonumaipea (2014–17)
    Ben Roberts (2014)
    Sam Kasiano (2018)
    Marion Seve (2019)
    Tino Faasuamaleaui (2019)

Tonga
    Fifita Moala (2000)
    Antonio Kaufusi (2008)
    Pita Maile (2009)
    Mahe Fonua (2013–15)
    Siosaia Vave (2013)
    Felise Kaufusi (2015–17, 2022)
    Nafe Seluini (2016)

Vanuatu
    Justin O'Neill (2012)

Wales
    Keith Mason (2002)

International Nines

Australia
    Josh Addo-Carr (2019)
    Ryan Papenhuyzen (2019)
    Curtis Scott (2019)

Fiji
    Suliasi Vunivalu (2019)
    Isaac Lumelume (2019)

Papua New Guinea
    Justin Olam (2019)

Samoa
    Tino Faasuamaleaui (2019)
    Marion Seve (2019)

State Of Origin

Queensland Maroons

114    Russell Bawden (2000–01)
140    Cameron Smith (2003–17)
142    Billy Slater (2004–05, 2008–15, 2017–18)
152    Greg Inglis (2006–10)
156    Dallas Johnson (2006–09)
163    Antonio Kaufusi (2007)
136    Michael Crocker (2008–09)
164    Israel Folau (2008–10)
168    Cooper Cronk (2010–17)
171    Dane Nielsen (2011–12)
179    Will Chambers (2014–15, 2017–19)
191    Tim Glasby (2017–18)
192    Cameron Munster (2017–22)
195    Felise Kaufusi (2018-22)
202    Christian Welch (2019-21)
209 Tino Faasuamaleaui (2020)
216 Brenko Lee (2020)
217 Harry Grant (2021-22)
205  Xavier Coates (2022)

New South Wales Blues

93    Glenn Lazarus (1998)
144    Rodney Howe (1998-01)
147    Robbie Kearns (1998, 2000–01, 2003)
150    Matt Geyer (1999)
152    Robbie Ross (1999)
159    Brett Kimmorley (2000)
162    Scott Hill (2000, 2002)
195    Matt King (2005–07)
202    Brett White (2007–10)
207    Ryan Hoffman (2007–08, 2013–14)
210    Anthony Quinn (2008)
213    Steve Turner (2008)
271    Josh Addo-Carr (2018-21)
287    Dale Finucane (2019-21)

City Vs Country Origin

NSW Country
    Scott Hill (2001, 2004–05)
    Matt King (2004–05)
    Brett White (2006–10)
    Clint Newton (2007)
    Anthony Quinn (2007–08)
    Ben Cross (2007)
    Ryan Hinchcliffe (2011, 2015)
    Dale Finucane (2015, 2016 & 2017)
    Jordan McLean (2016)
    Cheyse Blair (2017)

NSW City
    Matt Orford (2001, 2004)
    Robbie Kearns (2003)
    Matt Geyer (2006)
    Ryan Hoffman (2006–07, 2009–10, 2013–14)
    Beau Champion (2011)
    Josh Addo-Carr (2017)

All Stars Game

NRL All Stars
02    Brett Finch (2010)
08    Adam Blair (2010)
09    Cameron Smith (2010, 2011, 2013)
38    Cooper Cronk (2012)
47  Justin O'Neill (2013)
63    Jesse Bromwich (2015)
84    Jordan McLean (2017)

Indigenous All Stars
04  Beau Champion (2011)
37  Dane Nielsen (2012)
41  Will Chambers (2015, 2019)
  Tom Learoyd-Lahrs (2015)
64  Josh Addo-Carr (2019-20)

Māori All Stars
    Kenny Bromwich (2019-20)
    Jesse Bromwich (2019-20)
    Jahrome Hughes (2019-20)
    Brandon Smith (2019-20)
    Nelson Asofa-Solomona (2021)
    Reimis Smith (2022)
    Jayden Nikorima (2022)

Other honours

Prime Minister's XIII
    Will Chambers (2014)
    Ryan Hoffman (2014)
    Curtis Scott (2019)
    Tino Faasuamaleaui (2019)
    Josh King (2022)

New Zealand Māori
    Hep Cahill (2008)
    Kevin Proctor (2008, 2010)
    Kenny Bromwich (2014)

New South Wales Residents

All players were contracted with the Melbourne Storm while representing their New South Wales feeder club.

 Brett Anderson (2008)
Hep Cahill (2009)
James Maloney (2009)
Ryan Tandy (2008)
Aiden Guerra (2010)
Rory Kostjasyn (2010)
Gareth Widdop (2010)

Queensland Residents
All players were contracted with the Melbourne Storm while representing their Queensland feeder club.

 Anthony Bonus (1998)
 Daniel Frame (1999)
 Wade Fenton (1999)
 Steven Bell (2000)
 Jake Webster (2004)
 Jeremy Smith (2004-05)
 Nathan Friend (2005)
 Robert Tanielu (2005)
 Jackson Nicolau (2006)
 Scott Anderson (2006)
 Cody Walker (2013)
 Tim Glasby (2013)
 Felise Kaufusi (2014)
 Shaun Nona (2015)
 Ben Hampton (2015)
 Kenny Bromwich (2015)
 Francis Tualau (2016)
 Jahrome Hughes (2017)
 Billy Walters (2017-18)
 Dean Britt (2017-18)
 Scott Drinkwater (2018)
 Patrick Kaufusi (2018)
 Tino Fa'asuamaleaui (2019)
 Darryn Schonig (2019)

Junior Representatives

Junior Kangaroos
    Brad Watts (1999)
    Cameron Smith (2001-02)
    Antonio Kaufusi (2003)
    Ryan Hoffman (2003)
    Justin O'Neill (2010)
    Ben Hampton (2012)
    Mahe Fonua (2012)
    Cameron Munster (2014)
    Curtis Scott (2016–19)
    Brodie Croft (2017 & 2019)
    Tino Fa'asuamaleaui (2018-19)
    Louis Geraghty (2018)
    Ryan Papenhuyzen (2019)

Junior Kiwis
    Glen Turner (1998)
    Marty Turner (2000)
    Adam Blair (2002-03)
    Sam Tagataese (2005)
    Sika Manu (2006)
    Liam Foran (2007)
    Kevin Proctor (2007)
    Tohu Harris (2011–12)
    Kenny Bromwich (2011)
    Nelson Asofa-Solomona (2014–15)
    Tony Tumusa (2015)
    Brandon Smith (2016)
    Kayleb Milne (2018)
    Kelma Tuilagi (2018)

Queensland U20 Origin
04    Ben Hampton (2012)
08    Kurt Mann (2013)
35    Cameron Munster (2014)
37    Christian Welch (2014)
56    Brodie Croft (2016–17)
57    Charlie Galo (2016)
59    Josh Kerr (2016)
67    Lachlan Timm (2016)
68    Jake Turpin (2016)
76    Harry Grant (2017–18)
86    Tino Fa'asuamaleaui (2018-19)
89    Louis Geraghty (2018)
 Jack Bowyer (2020)
 Trent Loiero (2020)
 Daniel Atkinson (2020)
 Jack Howarth (2022)

New South Wales U20 Origin
17    Young Tonumaipea (2012)
18    Dean Britt (2013–14)
24    Matthew Lodge (2013–14)
37    Rhys Kennedy (2014)
59    Joe Stimson (2015)
71    Curtis Scott (2016–17)
    Ryan Papenhuyzen (2018)
    Cooper Johns (2019)
    Jonah Pezet (2022)

Representative Captains

State of Origin Captains
Queensland
    Cameron Smith (2008–17)
    Billy Slater (2018)
New South Wales
    Dale Finucane (Vice Captain- 2021)

World Cup Captains
Australia
    Cameron Smith (Vice Captain - 2008)

Test Captains
Australia
    Cameron Smith (2007–08, 2010–2013) 
    Cameron Smith (Vice-Captain - 2009)

New Zealand
    Adam Blair (Vice-Captain - 2009–2010)
    Jesse Bromwich (Captain - 2016, 2022)

Representative Coaching Staff

International
Australia
    Chris Anderson (Coach - 1999–01)
    Craig Bellamy (Assistant Coach - 2005–07)

New Zealand
26    Stephen Kearney (2008-11)

State Of Origin
New South Wales
    Craig Bellamy (Coach - 2008–10)

City Vs Country Origin
NSW Country
    Craig Bellamy (Coach - 2005–07)

References

 
 R
Rugby league representative players lists
Melbourne sport-related lists
National Rugby League lists